Pomaderris aspera, commonly known as hazel pomaderris, is a species of flowering plant in the family Rhamnaceae and is endemic to south-eastern Australia. It is a shrub or small tree with elliptic to lance-shaped or egg-shaped leaves and greenish-yellow flowers.

Description
The branchlets are covered with rust-coloured, star-shaped hairs when young. The upper surface of the leaves is dark green and impressed above the veins, the lower surface whitish with rust-coloured hairs on the veins. Flowering occurs in October and November and the fruit is a dark brown, glabrous capsule  in diameter containing a single bone-coloured seed.

Taxonomy
Hazel pomaderris was first formally described in 1825 by Augustin Pyramus de Candolle from an unpublished description by Franz Sieber. De Candolle's description was published in his Prodromus Systematis Naturalis Regni Vegetabilis. The specific epithet (aspera) means "rough".

Distribution and habitat
Pomaderris aspera grows in wet forest, especially near streams in gullies and mainly occurs south from Barrington Tops in New South Wales and the Australian Capital Territory, with scattered individuals in northern New South Wales and as far north as Bunya Mountains National Park in Queensland. It is common in southern and eastern Victoria, less so in northern Tasmania and may also occur in South Australia. The species has also been naturalised in New Zealand.

References

Flora of New South Wales
aspera
Flora of Victoria (Australia)
Flora of Queensland
Flora of the Australian Capital Territory
Flora of Tasmania
Trees of Australia